Chromosome 14 open reading frame 39, abbreviated C14orf39, and also known as Six6os1, is a protein that in humans is encoded by the SIX6OS1 gene.

References

Further reading